Echidnophaga is a genus of fleas. It includes species which are found in Africa, parts of Asia, southern Europe, and Australia. Fleas in this genus remain attached to their host in a single location for long periods of time, causing swelling and ulceration of tissue. To remain attach for long periods they use specialized mouthparts, which, compared to other fleas, are relatively much longer.

Species
Encyclopedia of Life lists the following species:

 Echidnophaga aethiops Jordan et Rothschild, 1906
 Echidnophaga ambulans Olliff, 1886
 Echidnophaga aranka M. Rothschild, 1936
 Echidnophaga bradyta Jordan et Rothschild, 1906
 Echidnophaga calabyi Mardon et Dunnet, 1971
 Echidnophaga cornuta Wagner, 1936
 Echidnophaga eyrei Mardon et Dunnet, 1971
 Echidnophaga gallinacea Westwood, 1875 Found mainly on poultry, but also on a variety of birds and mammals.
 Echidnophaga iberica Ribeiro, Lucientes, Osacar et Calvete, 1994
 Echidnophaga larina Jordan et Rothschild, 1906
 Echidnophaga liopus Jordan et Rothschild, 1906
 Echidnophaga macronychia Jordan et Rothschild, 1906
 Echidnophaga murina Tiraboschi, 1903
 Echidnophaga myrmecobii Rothschild, 1909 Found on rabbits.
 Echidnophaga ochotona Li Kuei-chen, 1957
 Echidnophaga octotricha Mardon et Dunnet, 1971
 Echidnophaga oschanini Wagner, 1930
 Echidnophaga perilis Jordan, 1925 Principally found on rabbits.
 Echidnophaga popovi Ioff et Argyropulo, 1934
 Echidnophaga suricatta Hastriter, 2000
 Echidnophaga tarda Jordan, 1925
 Echidnophaga tenerifensis Gil Collado, Rodrigues et Zapatero, 1982
 Echidnophaga tiscadaea Smit, 1967

References

Pulicidae
Siphonaptera genera